Cleve West is a multi award-winning garden designer who is based in Hampton Wick. He began designing in 1990 and has won six RHS gold medals at The Chelsea Flower Show. He won "Best in Show" and gold medal at both the 2011 and the 2012 Chelsea Flower Shows. He is one part of Three Men Went to Mow (along with fellow garden designers Joe Swift and James Alexander-Sinclair) who have made thirty YouTube films on gardening subjects.

He is listed in House & Garden (magazine) in 2021, as one of the top 50 garden designers in the UK.

References

External links
YouTube: Three men went to mow

English gardeners
English garden writers
Living people
Year of birth missing (living people)